Jennifer Gan (March 2, 1938 – September 15, 2000) was an American stage, film and television actress. She appeared in sixteen film and TV titles in the 1960s and early 1970s.

Career as Ginny Gan
A life member of The Actors Studio, she first began her career as Ginny Gan on the stage in musicals such as  Li'l Abner in 1958, The Pink Jungle in 1959 starring Ginger Rogers and Agnes Moorehead, and No Strings in 1962. She made her first TV appearance in a popular Alfred Hitchcock Hour episode in late 1964. She then appeared on stage in the musical Guys and Dolls, in 1965 with actress Sheila MacRae.

She was seen again in the spring of 1967 when making four more film and TV appearances. She appeared in the James Coburn spy spoof sequel In Like Flint and his tongue in cheek western Waterhole No. 3. She then appeared in an episode in the last season of the hit TV show The Monkees. She also had an uncredited role in the hit film Valley of the Dolls. She also appeared in the stage play The Two Gentlemen of Verona.

In 1968, she appeared in an episode in the last season of the hit TV show Batman. She then was cast in the hit family comedy film Yours, Mine and Ours. She had a speaking role with Henry Fonda in the coffee house scenes when he was on his big first date with Lucille Ball in the popular film.

Career as Jennifer Gan
In 1969, she changed her name to Jennifer Gan and continued performing until late 1972. She made appearances in episodes of The Virginian and Ironside. She then began a professional association with Roger Corman that lasted through two B movies. The first was Naked Angels where she starred as a biker chick, clad in leather and lace. The film featured a soundtrack co-written by fuzz guitarist Jeff Simmons. She also appeared as a dancer in the feature film Hello, Dolly!.
 
In 1970, she appeared in a first-season episode of the popular TV shows Love, American Style and Marcus Welby, M.D.. In 1971, she starred in her second Roger Corman film, Women in Cages. In 1972, she appeared in an episode of Nichols and made an appearance in the film The Great Northfield Minnesota Raid. She made her final onscreen appearance in a fourth-season episode of Marcus Welby, M.D., in 1972.

Gan died on September 15, 2000. Her cause of death remains unknown.

Stage credits

Filmography

References

External links
 

2000 deaths
American film actresses
American musical theatre actresses
American stage actresses
American television actresses
20th-century American actresses
1938 births
Actresses from Detroit
20th-century American singers
20th-century American women singers